Krikor Peshtimaldjian (Born Constantinople, Ottoman Turkey 1778 - died Constantinople, Ottoman Turkey January, 1839) was a prominent ethnic Armenian philosopher, educator, translator, and linguist. He was a key figure in the Armenian reawakening and reformist movement in the 19th century.

References 

1778 births
1839 deaths
Armenian-language writers
Philosophers from the Ottoman Empire
Educators from the Ottoman Empire
Ethnic Armenian translators
Armenians from the Ottoman Empire
19th-century writers from the Ottoman Empire
Writers from Istanbul
Logicians
19th-century philosophers
19th-century male writers